Marc Galanter is Professor of Psychiatry at New York University School of Medicine and has served as the Founding Director of the Division of Alcoholism and Drug Abuse. His studies have addressed family therapy for substance abuse, pharmacologic treatment for addiction, and Twelve Step recovery for addiction. He is an author of over 200 peer-reviewed articles. He chairs Twelve Step Interest Groups in AAAP, ASAM, and the International Society of Addiction Medicine and teaches at the New York University School of Medicine.

Galanter attended Albert Einstein College of Medicine (1969–1971) where he did his residency in psychiatry.  After that he was a Clinical Associate at the National Institute of Mental Health and then an NIH Career Teacher. He later served as president of the Association for Medical Education and Research in Substance Abuse (AMERSA) (1976–1977), the American Academy of Addiction Psychiatry (1991–1992), and the American Society of Addiction Medicine (1999–2001).

Books

. Sixth Edition, 2023.

See also
List of cult and new religious movement researchers

References

Albert Einstein College of Medicine alumni
American psychiatrists
Living people
New York University Grossman School of Medicine faculty
Researchers of new religious movements and cults
Year of birth missing (living people)